Franciscan priests established 21 missions between 1769 and 1833 in Alta California, accompanied by military outposts. Their goal was to spread Christianity among the local Native Americans, as well as to affirm Spanish, and later Mexican, claims to the region.

Overview
To facilitate overland travel, the mission settlements were situated approximately 30 miles (48 kilometers) apart, about one day's journey on horseback, or three days on foot. The entire trail eventually became a 600-mile (966-kilometer) long "California Mission Trail." Rev. Lasuén successfully argued that filling in the empty spaces along El Camino Real with additional outposts would provide much-needed rest stops where travelers could take lodging in relative safety and comfort. Heavy freight movement was practical only via water. Tradition has it that the padres sprinkled mustard seeds along the trail to mark it with bright yellow flowers.

Today a growing number of people, calling themselves California Mission Walkers, hike the mission trail route, usually in segments between the missions. Walking the trail is a way to connect with the history of the missions. For some it represents a spiritual pilgrimage, inspired by Jesuit priest Richard Roos' 1985 book, Christwalk. The loosely organized group is attempting to formalize the route and establish markers, similar to the  El Camino de Santiago, in Spain.

Missions
There were 21 missions, 8 asistencias, and 5 estancias in what is now California.

Two Franciscan missions, Mission Puerto de Purísima Concepción and Mission San Pedro y San Pablo de Bicuñer, were constructed within the present-day borders of California but were administered as part of the Spanish missions of Pimería Alta. As such, they are not considered a part of the 21 missions of Alta California.

Asistencias
Asistencias were branch missions that allowed the priests to extend their reach into the native population at a modest cost.

Estancias
An estancia or estância is a Spanish or Portuguese term describing private landholdings used for farming or raising livestock. They assisted in the development of their parent missions.

Presidios
Presidios in chronological order:
 El Presidio Real de San Diego (Presidio of San Diego), founded July 16, 1769
 El Presidio Real de San Carlos de Monterey (Presidio of Monterey, California), founded June 3, 1770
 El Presidio Real de San Francisco (Presidio of San Francisco), founded December 17, 1776
 El Presidio Real de Santa Bárbara (Presidio of Santa Barbara), founded April 12, 1782
 El Presidio de Sonoma (Sonoma Barracks), founded 1810

See also 

On Spanish Missions:
 Spanish missions in Arizona
 Spanish missions in Baja California
 Spanish missions in the Sonoran Desert (including Sonora and southern Arizona)

On California history:
 Juan Bautista de Anza National Historic Trail
 History of California through 1899
 History of the west coast of North America
 Mission Vieja

On general missionary history:
 Catholic Church and the Age of Discovery
 History of Christian Missions
 List of the oldest churches in Mexico
 Missionary

On colonial Spanish American history:
 Spanish colonization of the Americas
 California mission clash of cultures
 Indian Reductions
 California Genocide
 Native Americans in the United States

References

External links

California Missions Foundation
California Mission Studies Association
California's Spanish Missions
Library of Congress: American Memory Project: Early California History, The Missions
Tricia Anne Weber: The Spanish Missions of California
California Historical Society
National Register of Historic Places: Early History of the California Coast: List of Sites
California Mission Sketches by Henry Miller, 1856 and Finding Aid to the Documents relating to Missions of the Californias : typescript, 1768-1802 at The Bancroft Library

Spanish mission settlements in North America
Native American history of California
California Mission Indians